Krisztina Medveczky (born 14 April 1958) is a retired Hungarian gymnast. She competed at the 1972 and 1976 Summer Olympics in all artistic gymnastics events and finished in third and fourth place in the team competition, respectively. Her best individual result was ninth place on the balance beam in 1972. She won another bronze team medal at the 1974 World Artistic Gymnastics Championships.

At the 1976 Olympics in Montreal, she met a researcher in pharmaceutical chemistry. They soon married and she followed him to several countries, including the UK and Australia. They have three daughters, Adrienn, Alexandra and Bettina, who live in Brisbane and Sydney, Australia.

References

External links 
 

1958 births
Living people
Hungarian female artistic gymnasts
Gymnasts at the 1972 Summer Olympics
Gymnasts at the 1976 Summer Olympics
Olympic gymnasts of Hungary
Olympic bronze medalists for Hungary
Olympic medalists in gymnastics
Medalists at the 1972 Summer Olympics
Medalists at the World Artistic Gymnastics Championships
Gymnasts from Budapest
20th-century Hungarian women
21st-century Hungarian women